Pterolophia anticemaculata is a species of  longhorn beetle in the family Cerambycidae. It was described by Stephan von Breuning in 1938. It is known from Borneo.

References

anticemaculata
Beetles described in 1938